Tom Wright (born 21 July 1997) is an Australian national representative rugby union footballer who plays as a winger and fullback for the Brumbies in Super Rugby and Australia at international level.

He made his Australian representative rugby union debut for the Wallabies in the 2020 Bledisloe Cup series.

Background
Wright was born in Randwick, New South Wales, Australia. Tom played his junior rugby league for Clovelly Crocodiles and La Perouse Panthers. His junior rugby union was played with the Clovelly Eagles and then at high school while attending St Joseph's College, Hunters Hill.

Rugby league
Wright made his NRL debut in Round 10, 2018 for Manly Sea Eagles against the Brisbane Broncos.

Rugby union
In September 2018 Wright joined rugby union club, the ACT Brumbies on a two year deal.

He'd go on to make his starting debut for the Wallabies against the All Blacks in November 2020, scoring in the 24-22 win at Suncorp Stadium.

Wright re-signed with the Brumbies and Rugby Australia until the end of 2023.

International Tries 
As of 16 July 2022

References

External links
Manly Sea Eagles profile

1997 births
Australian rugby union players
Australia international rugby union players
Australian rugby league players
Manly Warringah Sea Eagles players
Rugby league five-eighths
Rugby league players from Sydney
Living people
Rugby union centres
Rugby union wings
ACT Brumbies players
Canberra Vikings players
Rugby union players from Sydney